Fotla Corona is a  diameter feature on Nsomeka Planitia, Venus.

Geology of the corona

Fotla Corona presents a variety of tectonic structures, including three farra of decreasing size from north to south (the largest in the north has a diameter of about 35 km) aligned along a line that intersects the corona in its part West. A rather complex fracture network is visible to the northeast, which among other volcanic structures are visible, probably due to effusion of lava through existing fractures, leading to the collapse of land located above.

A set of volcanic domes aligned with the southern part of the circumference of the corona is visible, and a smooth land area in the center of the formation, perhaps the recent lava. These observations highlight the central role of volcanism in the genesis of coronae.

Surface features of Venus